The Beaumont Hotel is a Grade II listed luxury hotel in Mayfair, London, United Kingdom. One of its rooms was designed by Antony Gormley as a public sculpture.

Location

The hotel is located at 8 Balderton Street, Mayfair, near Brown Hart Gardens. It has 73 rooms, including 23 studios and suites, and opened in September 2014.

History
The building was erected as a garage in 1925–1926 by the architects Wimperis and Simpson on behalf of Macy's Ltd.

Historic England note that "the façade is remarkably ambitious for a car park of this date", as well as "its importance in the evolution of the multi-storey car park as a distinctive C20 building type".

The building was Grade II listed  by Historic England in 2009.

In 2014, Antony Gormley designed a room as a public sculpture.

References

External links

Mayfair
Grade II listed hotels
Hotels in London
Hotel buildings completed in 1926
Grade II listed buildings in the City of Westminster